The Ivory Coast women's national volleyball team represents the Ivory Coast in international women's volleyball competitions and friendly matches.

The team qualified for the 2005 Women's African Volleyball Championship and placed 7th.

References
Ivory Coast Volleyball Federation

National women's volleyball teams
Volleyball
Volleyball in Ivory Coast
Women's sport in Ivory Coast